Lincoln Homer Jackson (September 25, 1907 – November 1970) was an American baseball first baseman in the Negro leagues. He played with the Cuban House of David in 1932, Pollock's Cuban Stars in 1933 and the Baltimore Black Sox in 1934.

References

External links
 and Baseball-Reference Black Baseball stats and Seamheads

Baltimore Black Sox players
Cuban House of David players
Pollock's Cuban Stars players
1907 births
1970 deaths
Baseball players from Missouri
Baseball first basemen
20th-century African-American sportspeople